Tracy Chapman (born March 30, 1964) is an American singer-songwriter. Chapman is best known for her hit singles "Fast Car" and "Give Me One Reason".

Chapman was signed to Elektra Records by Bob Krasnow in 1987. The following year she released her debut album, Tracy Chapman, which became a commercial success, boosted by her appearance at the Nelson Mandela 70th Birthday Tribute concert, and was certified 6× Platinum by the Recording Industry Association of America. The album received six Grammy Award nominations, including one for Album of the Year, three of which she won; Best New Artist, Best Female Pop Vocal Performance for her single "Fast Car", and Best Contemporary Folk Album. In 1989, Chapman released her second album, Crossroads, which earned her an additional Grammy Award nomination for Best Contemporary Folk Album. Her third album, Matters of the Heart, followed in 1992.

Chapman's fourth album, New Beginning, was released in 1995 and became another worldwide success. It was certified 5× platinum by the RIAA and yielded the hit single "Give Me One Reason", which earned Chapman the Grammy Award for Best Rock Song. Five years would pass before the release of her fifth album, Telling Stories (2000). Let It Rain and Where You Live followed in 2002 and 2005, respectively. Chapman's most recent studio album is Our Bright Future, released in 2008. The remastered compilation album Greatest Hits, which was curated by Chapman herself, was released in 2015.

Early life
Chapman was born in Cleveland, Ohio. Her parents divorced when she was four years old. Chapman was raised by her mother, who bought her a ukulele at age three. Chapman began playing guitar and writing songs at age eight. She says that she may have been first inspired to play the guitar by the television show Hee Haw. In her native Cleveland, Chapman experienced frequent bullying and racially motivated assaults as a child.

Raised a Baptist, Chapman attended an Episcopal high school and was accepted into the program A Better Chance, which sponsors students at college preparatory high schools away from their home communities. She graduated from Wooster School in Connecticut then attended Tufts University, graduating with a B.A. degree in Anthropology and African studies. While a student at Tufts, she busked in nearby spots, including Harvard Square and on MBTA Red Line platforms.

Career
Chapman made her major-stage debut as an opening act for women's music pioneer Linda Tillery at Boston's Strand Theatre on May 3, 1985. Another Tufts student, Brian Koppelman, heard Chapman playing and brought her to the attention of his father, Charles Koppelman. Koppelman, who ran SBK Publishing, signed Chapman in 1986. After Chapman graduated from Tufts in 1987, he helped her to sign a contract with Elektra Records.

At Elektra, she released Tracy Chapman (1988). The album was critically acclaimed, and she began touring and building a fanbase. "Fast Car" began its rise on the U.S. charts soon after she performed it at the televised Nelson Mandela 70th Birthday Tribute concert at Wembley Stadium, London, in June 1988. At the concert, Chapman initially performed a short set in the afternoon, but reached a larger audience when she was a last-minute stand in for Stevie Wonder, who had technical difficulties. This appearance is credited with greatly accelerating sales of the single and album. "Fast Car" became a No. 6 pop hit on the Billboard Hot 100 for the week ending August 27, 1988.   Rolling Stone ranked the song No. 167 on their 2010 list of "The 500 Greatest Songs of All Time". "Talkin' 'bout a Revolution", the follow-up to "Fast Car", charted at No. 75 and was followed by "Baby Can I Hold You", which peaked at No. 48. The album sold well, going multi-platinum and winning three Grammy Awards, including an honor for Chapman as Best New Artist. Later in 1988, Chapman was a featured performer on the worldwide Amnesty International Human Rights Now! Tour.

Chapman's follow-up album, Crossroads (1989), was less commercially successful than her debut had been, but it still achieved platinum status in the U.S. In 1992, Chapman released Matters of the Heart. Her fourth album, New Beginning (1995), proved successful, selling over five million copies in the U.S. alone. The album included the hit single "Give Me One Reason", which won the 1997 Grammy for Best Rock Song and became Chapman's most successful single in the U.S. to date, peaking at No. 3 on the Billboard Hot 100, and going Platinum. Following a four-year hiatus, her fifth album, Telling Stories, was released in 2000, and later went gold.  Chapman released her sixth album, Let It Rain, in (2002).

Chapman was commissioned by the American Conservatory Theater to compose music for its production of Athol Fugard's Blood Knot, a play on apartheid in South Africa, staged in early 2008. Atlantic Records released Chapman's eighth studio album, Our Bright Future (2008). The album earned Chapman a Grammy nomination for Best Contemporary Folk Album the following year. 

Chapman was appointed a member of the 2014 Sundance Film Festival U.S. Documentary jury. Chapman performed Ben E. King's "Stand By Me" on one of the final episodes of the Late Show with David Letterman in April 2015. The performance became a viral hit and was the focus of various news articles including some by Billboard and The Huffington Post.

On November 20, 2015, Chapman released Greatest Hits, consisting of 18 tracks including the live version of "Stand by Me", the album is Chapman's first global compilation release.

In October 2018, Chapman sued the rapper Nicki Minaj over copyright infringement, alleging that Minaj had sampled her song "Baby Can I Hold You" without permission. Chapman stated that she had "repeatedly denied" permission for "Baby Can I Hold You" to be sampled. The lawsuit alleged that Minaj had engaged in copyright infringement (a) by creating the song "Sorry" and (b) by distributing it; she requested an injunction to prevent Minaj from releasing the song. According to the lawsuit, Chapman has a policy of declining all requests for permission to sample her songs. In September 2020, District Court Judge Virginia A. Phillips granted summary judgment in favor of Minaj on the first count of Chapman's complaint, stating that Minaj's experimentation with Chapman's song constituted fair use rather than copyright infringement. However, the judge ruled that the second count of the complaint should go to trial. In January 2021, the dispute was settled when Minaj paid Chapman $450,000.

On the eve of the 2020 United States presidential election, Chapman performed "Talkin' 'bout a Revolution" on Late Night with Seth Meyers, encouraging people to vote.

Social activism
Chapman is politically and socially active. In a 2009 interview with National Public Radio, she said, "I'm approached by lots of organizations and lots of people who want me to support their various charitable efforts in some way. And I look at those requests and I basically try to do what I can. And I have certain interests of my own, generally an interest in human rights." In 1988, she performed in London as part of a worldwide concert tour to commemorate the 40th anniversary of the Universal Declaration of Human Rights with Amnesty International. That same year, Chapman performed at a tribute concert in honor of South African activist and leader Nelson Mandela's 70th birthday, an event which raised money for South Africa's Anti-Apartheid Movement and several children's charities. She also performed at the event to commemorate the 50th anniversary of Amnesty International held in Paris on 10 December 1998, known as "The Struggle Continues...". She was one of the guest artists at Pavarotti & Friends for Cambodia and Tibet on June 6, 2000, at which she performed a critically acclaimed duet with Luciano Pavarotti of "Baby Can I Hold You Tonight". In 2004, Chapman performed and rode in the AIDS/LifeCycle event.

Chapman has been involved with Cleveland's elementary schools, producing an educational music video highlighting achievements in African-American history. Chapman sponsored "Crossroads in Black History", an essay contest for high school students in Cleveland and other cities.

Chapman received an honorary doctorate from Saint Xavier University in Chicago in 1997. In 2004, Chapman was given an honorary doctorate in Fine Arts by her alma mater, Tufts University, recognizing her commitment to social activism.

Chapman often performs at charity events such as Make Poverty History, amfAR, and AIDS/LifeCycle. She is a feminist.

Personal life
Although Chapman has never publicly disclosed her sexual orientation, writer Alice Walker has stated that she and Chapman were in a romantic relationship during the mid-1990s. Chapman maintains a strong separation between her personal and professional life. "I have a public life that's my work life and I have my personal life", she said. "In some ways, the decision to keep the two things separate relates to the work I do."

Discography

Studio albums
Tracy Chapman (1988)
Crossroads (1989)
Matters of the Heart (1992)
New Beginning (1995)
Telling Stories (2000)
Let It Rain (2002)
Where You Live (2005)
Our Bright Future (2008)

Awards and nominations

Grammy Awards

Other awards and nominations

References

External links

Atlantic Records page

 
1964 births
20th-century African-American women singers
21st-century African-American women singers
20th-century American women guitarists
20th-century American guitarists
21st-century American women guitarists
21st-century American guitarists
20th-century American women singers
21st-century American women singers
African-American women singer-songwriters
African-American feminists
African-American guitarists
American street performers
American acoustic guitarists
American contraltos
American folk guitarists
American folk rock musicians
American folk singers
Atlantic Records artists
Blues rock musicians
Brit Award winners
Elektra Records artists
Fast Folk artists
Feminist musicians
Grammy Award winners
Guitarists from Ohio
Living people
Musicians from Cleveland
Singer-songwriters from Ohio
Tufts University School of Arts and Sciences alumni
20th-century American singers
21st-century American singers
LGBT African Americans
LGBT feminists
LGBT people from Ohio
American LGBT musicians